Flying Nun Records is a New Zealand independent record label formed in Christchurch in 1981 by music store manager Roger Shepherd. Described by The Guardian as "one of the world's great independent labels", Flying Nun is notable for bringing global attention to the Dunedin sound, a cultural and musical movement in early 1980s Dunedin, which gave rise to modern indie rock.

History

The label formed in the wake of a flurry of new post-punk-inspired labels appearing in New Zealand in the early 1980s, in particular Propeller Records in Auckland. Shepherd had intended to record the original local music of Christchurch, but soon the label rose to national prominence by championing the emerging music of Dunedin.

"Ambivalence" by The Pin Group (the first band of Roy Montgomery) was the first release from Flying Nun, although "Tally Ho" by The Clean was the first release to draw public attention to the label, as it unexpectedly reached number nineteen in the New Zealand charts, bringing the label unanticipated profile and income. There followed the seminal Dunedin Double, a release which cemented the place of the southern city in the forefront of New Zealand independent music. Flying Nun moved into the full-length album market in 1982 with the Ego Gratification Album by Chris Knox and Beatin Hearts by Builders (recorded 1982, Auckland).

Many of New Zealand's most prominent kiwi rock and alternative bands have signed to Flying Nun at some stage in their careers. In 2000 Australian youth radio network Triple J produced a list of the thirty "Greatest New Zealand acts of all time", twenty of them by Flying Nun artists. The label has been home to various styles of music, including the much-debated Dunedin sound, "high-end pop with a twist", lo-fi experimentation, strongly Velvet Underground-influenced pop, minimalism, industrial, and rock-electronic crossover.

In 1999 Matthew Bannister of The Sneaky Feelings wrote Positively George Street: A Personal History of the Sneaky Feelings and the Dunedin Sound, covering the New Zealand music industry of the 1980s, including Flying Nun.

In 1990 Festival Records bought a fifty-percent stake in Flying Nun, and then in 2000 merged it with Mushroom Records, bringing Flying Nun into the Festival-Mushroom Records family of companies. Warner Music Group acquired Flying Nun as part of its purchase of FMR (Festival Mushroom Records) in 2006. A consortium that included Shepherd bought back the label from Warner on 21 December 2009, for "more than what I sold it for". New Zealand musician Neil Finn, his wife Sharon, and another business partner together own a quarter-share in the repatriated record label.

In 2013, American label Captured Tracks announced plans for selected reissues of Flying Nun's back catalogue.

In the 2018 Queen's Birthday Honours Shepherd was appointed an Officer of the New Zealand Order of Merit (ONZM) for services to the music industry.

Roster, early 1980s to mid-1990s

 Able Tasmans
 The Axemen
 Bailter Space
 The Bats
 The Bilders
 Bird Nest Roys
 The Chills
 The Clean
 Crude
 The Dead C
 Dead Famous People
 The Expendables
 Exploding Budgies
 From Scratch 
 Alastair Galbraith
 Goblin Mix
 The Gordons
 The Great Unwashed
 Headless Chickens
 Jean-Paul Sartre Experience
 David Kilgour
 Chris Knox
 Look Blue Go Purple
 Loves Ugly Children
 Mainly Spaniards
 Marching Orders
 The Max Block
 The Pin Group
 The Puddle
 The Renderers
 Scorched Earth Policy
 The Skeptics
 Snapper (band)
 Sneaky Feelings
 The Stones
 Straitjacket Fits
 Tall Dwarfs
 The Terminals
 This Sporting Life
 3Ds
 The Verlaines
 The Vibraslaps

Roster from the mid-1990s
Since the mid-1990s many of the original stable of artists have split up or moved to other labels, including Xpressway Records (Port Chalmers, New Zealand), Arch Hill Recordings (Auckland), Powertool Records (Auckland), South Indies, Paris or Matador Records (United States). A similarly eclectic new generation of bands is signed to Flying Nun, including:

 Aldous Harding
 Badd Energy
 Betchadupa
 Bressa Creeting Cake
 Cloudboy
 The Courtneys
 The D4 (formerly)
 DARTZ
 Die! Die! Die!
 Erny Belle
 Fazerdaze
 Garageland
 Gerling
 Ghost Club
 Grayson Gilmour
 HDU
 Mermaidens
 The Mint Chicks (formerly)
 Pan Am (formerly)
 Pavement
 The Phoenix Foundation
 Reb Fountain
 Recitals
 The Subliminals

Compilations
Flying Nun also released compilations of a cross-section of its artists. These are now the only easy-to-find documents of certain featured artists.

 Tuatara (1985)
 In Love With These Times (1990)
 Roger Sings the Hits (1991)
 Getting Older 1981-1991 (1991)
 Pink Flying Saucers over the Southern Alps (1991)
 Shrewd: A Compilation of NZ Women's Music (1993)
 The Sound Is Out There (1995)
 Pop Eyed (1996)
 15 – Flying Nun Records (1996)
 Topless Women Talk About Their Lives (film soundtrack) (1997)
 How Much For Trade? – 1998 Flying Nun Sampler (1998)
 Scarfies (film soundtrack) (1999)
 Under the Influence - 21 Years of Flying Nun Records (2002)
 Speed of Sound (2003)
 Very Short Films (music video compilation DVD) (2003)
 Second Season (music video compilation DVD) (2004)
 Where In The World Is Wendy Broccoli? (2006)
 Flying Nun 25th Anniversary Box Set (2006)
 Tally Ho!: Flying Nun's Greatest Bits (2011)
 Time To Go: The Southern Psychedelic Moment 1981-1986 (2012)

Further reading
 Bannister, M. (1999). Positively George Street. Auckland: Reed Books.

See also 
 List of record labels
 Music of New Zealand

References

External links  
 Official Flying Nun site
radionz.co.nz/flyingnun – A five-part Radio New Zealand documentary about the label and its musicians.
tallyho.co.nz –  website that has a large number of Flying Nun concert posters, magazine advert and misc.
 In love with those times  — detailed feature-article from Stylus Magazine  on Flying Nun artists
 "Dunedin and Christchurch Bands" — Part Two of a 3-part TV New Zealand series from 1984, featuring interviews and live footage of several Flying Nun Records bands.
 Heavenly Pop Hits – The Flying Nun Story full length 2002 documentary on NZ On Screen
 Flying Nun Records master tape archive at the Alexander Turnbull Library

 
New Zealand independent record labels
Record labels established in 1981
Alternative rock record labels
Dunedin Sound